Toby Stephens (born 21 April 1969) is an English actor who has appeared in films in the UK, US and India. He is known for the roles of Bond villain Gustav Graves in the 2002 James Bond film Die Another Day (for which he was nominated for the Saturn Award for Best Supporting Actor), of William Gordon in the 2005 Mangal Pandey: The Rising film, Edward Fairfax Rochester in a BBC television adaptation of Jane Eyre and as Captain Flint in the Starz television series Black Sails. Stephens was one of the leads in the Netflix science fiction series Lost in Space, which began streaming in 2018.

Early life 

Stephens, the younger son of actors Dame Maggie Smith and Sir Robert Stephens, was born on 21 April 1969 at the Middlesex Hospital in Fitzrovia, London. He was educated at Aldro School and Seaford College. He then trained at the London Academy of Music and Dramatic Art (LAMDA).

Career 
Stephens began his film career with the role of Othello in 1992, in Sally Potter's Orlando. He has since made regular appearances on television (including in The Camomile Lawn, 1992) and on stage.

He played the title role in a Royal Shakespeare Company production of Coriolanus shortly after graduation from LAMDA; that same season he played Claudio in Measure for Measure for the RSC. He played Stanley Kowalski in a West End production of Tennessee Williams' A Streetcar Named Desire, and Hamlet in 2004. He has appeared on Broadway in Ring Round the Moon. He played the lead in the film Photographing Fairies and played Orsino in Trevor Nunn's 1996 film adaptation of William Shakespeare's Twelfth Night. In 2002 he took on the role of Gustav Graves in the James Bond film Die Another Day. Aged 33 at the time of film's release, he remains the youngest actor to have played a Bond villain.

In 2005 he played the role of a British Army captain in the Indian film, The Rising: Ballad of Mangal Pandey, portraying events in the Indian rebellion of 1857. The following year he returned to India to play a renegade British East India Company officer in Sharpe's Challenge. In late 2006 he starred as Edward Rochester in the  highly acclaimed BBC television adaptation of Jane Eyre (broadcast in the United States on PBS in early 2007) and The Wild West in February 2007 for the BBC in which he played General George Armstrong Custer in Custer's Last Stand.

During mid-2007, Stephens played the role of Jerry in a revival of Harold Pinter's Betrayal under the direction of Roger Michell. Later that year, Stephens starred as Horner in Jonathan Kent's revival of William Wycherley's The Country Wife. The play was the inaugural production of the Theatre Royal Haymarket Company.

In February 2008, the Fox Broadcasting Company gave the go-ahead to cast Stephens as the lead in a potential one hour, prime time US television show, Inseparable, to be produced by Shaun Cassidy. Billed as a modern Jekyll and Hyde story, the show was to feature a partially paralysed forensic psychologist whose other personality is a charming criminal. Stephens' casting was highly unusual, because Fox had not yet approved a script nor purchased a pilot for the show. However, in mid-May 2008, The Hollywood Reporter announced that "[b]y the time the network picked up the pilot (...) [the producers'] hold on Stephens had expired (...)"

In May 2008, Stephens performed the role of James Bond in a BBC Radio 4 production of Ian Fleming's Dr. No, as part of the centenary celebration of Fleming's birth. The production was reportedly the first BBC radio dramatisation of the novel though Moonraker was on South African radio in 1956, with Bob Holness providing the voice of Bond. He has since appeared in a number of adaptations of other James Bond novels.

Also in May 2008, Stock-pot Productions announced that Stephens will have the lead role in a feature-length film entitled Fly Me, co-starring Tim McInnerny. Stock-pot was the producer of One Day, a short 2006 film shown at international film festivals, in which Stephens played a small part as the boss of McInnerny's character.

On 5 October 2008, Stephens appeared onstage at the London Palladium as part of a benefit entitled "The Story of James Bond, A Tribute to Ian Fleming". The event, organised by Fleming's niece, Lucy Fleming, featured music from various James Bond films and Bond film stars reading from Fleming's Bond novels. Stephens took the part of James Bond himself in the readings.

In early December 2008, Stephens read from Coda, the last book written by friend Simon Gray, for BBC Radio 4. The excerpts from which Stephens read included Gray's description of his participation as godfather at the christening of Stephens' son Eli.

Early in 2009, Stephens appeared as Prince John in season 3 of the BBC series Robin Hood. The series aired on BBC America in the United States. Stephens appeared in two episodes of a six-part television series, Strike Back, based on the novel by Chris Ryan. The series aired in May 2010.

In mid-2009, Stephens returned to the London stage in the Donmar Warehouse production of Ibsen's A Doll's House alongside Gillian Anderson and Christopher Eccleston.

In 2010, he starred in the made-for-television film The Blue Geranium, a further sequel to the television series and films based on Agatha Christie's Miss Marple character. The show was broadcast in the US on PBS in June 2010. Stephens starred as a highly self-centred detective opposite Lucy Punch in a three-part comedy television series for BBC Two entitled Vexed.

Stephens took on a small supporting role in a short film, The Lost Explorer, the directorial debut of photographer Tim Walker. The film is based on a short story by author Patrick McGrath.

On the London stage in the spring of 2010, Stephens received outstanding reviews for his performance as Henry in a revival of Tom Stoppard's The Real Thing, directed by Anna Mackmin at the Old Vic Theatre in London. Of debuting at the Old Vic, where his parents performed as part of Laurence Olivier's Royal National Theatre Company, Stephens said: "It's quite moving for me to do something there. It means it has an added fascination. It was an historic place but I never saw anything when [my parents] were there, which is really sad, because I was just born. I'm a huge admirer of Stoppard's work."

In 2010, Stephens appeared as Georges Danton in Danton's Death. The play was another debut for Stephens, this time at London's Royal National Theatre.

Over the years, Stephens has continued to prolifically narrate audiobooks and perform in broadcast radio dramas. In January 2011, Stephens joined other stars in narrating portions of the King James Version of the Bible for BBC Radio 4 as part of a celebration of the 400th anniversary of the Bible's publication. Stephens performed the role of Raymond Chandler's Philip Marlowe in a radio serial, which debuted in February 2011. Stephens narrated another audiobook, Paul Temple and the Geneva Mystery, released in February 2011.

From 2014 to 2017, Stephens starred as Captain James Flint in the Starz television series Black Sails, a prequel to Treasure Island set in the early 18th century during the Golden Age of Piracy.

In 2016, he was cast as former British Prime Minister Tony Blair in the film The Journey.

Between 2018 and 2021, he appeared as John Robinson in Lost in Space, the Netflix remake of the 1965 TV series. In 2021, he featured as Damian Cray in the second season of Alex Rider.

He is set to appear as the Greek God Poseidon in upcoming series Percy Jackson and the Olympians, the Disney+ adaption of the books by the same name.

Personal life 
Stephens and New Zealand actress Anna-Louise Plowman were married in 2001. Their first child, son Eli Alistair, was born in May 2007. The  British playwright Simon Gray (who penned Japes, a stage play, and Missing Dates, a radio drama, both of which starred Stephens) was reported to be Eli's godfather. Their daughters Tallulah and Kura were born in May 2009 and in September 2010, respectively.

Plowman and Stephens performed together as Sibyl and Elyot in Jonathan Kent's revival of Private Lives —the Noel Coward play in which his mother starred in 1975 on Broadway—for the 2012 Chichester Festival, reprised at the Gielgud Theatre in 2013.

Filmography

Film

Television

Video games

Theatre

Radio drama and audio books

Awards 
 1992—Ian Charleson Award Second Prize: for Bertram in All's Well That Ends Well (Swan Theatre)
 1994—Ian Charleson Award (best classical actor under 30): for Coriolanus in Coriolanus (Royal Shakespeare Company)
 1994—Sir John Gielgud Award (best actor): for Coriolanus in Coriolanus (Royal Shakespeare Company)
 1999—Theatre World Award (debut performance on Broadway): for Hugo/Frederick in Ring Round the Moon (Lincoln Center Theater)

References

Interviews and articles 
 The Independent – It'll Be All Right on the Night (27 March 1994)
 The New York Times – It's Not Romantic or Oedipal: It's Just the Family Business (24 April 1999)
 The Times – My Cultural Life (23 November 2002)
 The Sunday Telegraph – Villain with a Past (16 December 2002)
 San Francisco Chronicle – Traitor? It's No Easy Gig (19 October 2003)
 Stephens on Hamlet, Essay for RSC Website (2004)
 The Times – Interview: Toby Stephens (4 July 2004)
 The Telegraph – The Perils of Being Posh on TV (16 March 2006)
 The Independent – Toby Stephens: My Life in Travel (18 March 2006)
 The Times – Every Woman Has Her Own Idea of Mr. Rochester (29 August 2006)
 The Guardian – Prodigal Son (31 May 2007)
 The Times – Mr. Rochester Takes His Bow (3 September 2007)
 The Evening Standard – Restoring His Humour (2 October 2007)
 Angel & North – Charming Chameleon (2007)
 SFX – Meet the New James Bond (20 May 2008)
 BBC Press Office – Robin Hood returns to BBC One (27 March 2009)
 The Daily Telegraph – Being Born into the Theatre was a Mixed Blessing (21 May 2009)
 The Times – Diary: Toby Stephens (20 June 2009)
 London Evening Standard – Toby Stephens to Face Family History at Old Vic (23 March 2010)
 The Times – Toby Stephens: Of course I'd act with my mother (1 April 2010)
 The Spectator – Silencing the Voices (17 July 2010)
 The Guardian – This much I know: Toby Stephens (18 July 2010)
 OfficialLondonTheatre.com – The Big Interview: Toby Stephens (28 July 2010)

External links 
 

1969 births
Living people
20th-century English male actors
21st-century English male actors
Alumni of the London Academy of Music and Dramatic Art
British people of English descent
English male film actors
English male radio actors
English male Shakespearean actors
English male stage actors
English male television actors
English male voice actors
English people of Scottish descent
Ian Charleson Award winners
Male actors from London
People educated at Aldro
People educated at Seaford College
People from Harringay
Royal Shakespeare Company members
Theatre World Award winners